Squaw Island may refer to:

 Skenoh Island, (formerly known as Squaw Island) New York
 Susquehanna River Island, (formerly known as Squaw island) New York
 Ojibwa Island (formerly Squaw Island) in the Beaver Island group
 Squaw Island Light, a lighthouse on Ojibwa Island in Lake Michigan
 Unity Island, an island in the Niagara River in Buffalo, New York, formerly known as Squaw Island
 Halls Island, a strip of land near Hyanis Port, Massachusetts. Formerly known as Squaw Island

See also

 Old Squaw Islands, Nunavut